Macedonia Township is a township in Pottawattamie County, Iowa, USA.

History
Macedonia Township was organized in 1857.

References

Townships in Pottawattamie County, Iowa
Townships in Iowa
1857 establishments in Iowa
Populated places established in 1857